Below is the party list of the Christian Democratic Appeal (CDA) for the 2012 Dutch general election. Chosen candidates are in italics, the lijsttrekker is also in bold. Thirteen candidates have been chosen: the numbers 1 to 12 and 39. Obtained votes are added.

Candidate list 
Sybrand van Haersma Buma (MP), 517,397
Mona Keijzer, 127,446
Sander de Rouwe (MP), 15,814
Raymond Knops (MP),  8,466
Michel Rog, 1,382
Eddy van Hijum (MP), 2,719
Hanke Bruins Slot (MP), 3,765
Jaco Geurts, 5,648
Agnes Mulder, 9,824
Peter Oskam, 702
Pieter Heerma, 981
Madeleine van Toorenburg (MP), 3,558
Martijn van Helvert 13,952
Erik Ronnes 3,985
Herma Boom 2,578
Mustafa Amhaouch 1,949
Marieke van der Werf (MP)  809
Bernard Schermers 477
Patricia de Milliano 6,104
Marc Jager 5,237
Harry van der Molen 1,196
Dinand Ekkel 594
Arjan Erkel 3,515
Turan Yazir 4,158
Michiel Holtackers (MP)  347
Elske van der Mik 949
Dave Ensberg-Kleijkers 678
Efsthathios Andreou 137
Wilma van der Rijt - van der Kruis 970
Ties Sweyen 732
Anne-Marie Vreman 406
Yang Soo Kloosterhof 487
Nelleke Weltevrede 335
Gerben Karssenberg 237
Merijn Snoek 424
Ebubekir Öztüre 6,003
Han Hoogma 1,227
Ellen Verkoelen 455
Pieter Omtzigt (MP), 36,750
Jobke Vonk-Vedder 221
Jan Eerbeek 369
Dirk van de Mast 136
Chantal van Steenderen-Broekhuis 228
John van Hal 426
Margriet van de Vooren 163
Claudia Füss-Buitenhuis 397
Hans Moerland 129
Geeske Telgen-Swarts 326
Mitra Rambaran 442
Jan Kramer 404
Jeffrey Agtmaal 820
Fons d'Haens 1,246
Jan-Jaap de Haan 177
Remko ten Barge 2,918
Gert Boeve 105
Erik de Ridder 205
Hugo de Jonge 545

References 

2012 elections in the Netherlands
Christian Democratic Appeal